Stapleford railway station was a station on the Hertford Loop Line, and was situated in the village of Stapleford, Hertfordshire, England.

History
The station was opened by the London and North Eastern Railway on 2 June 1924. Like Watton-at-Stone, it was closed on 10 September 1939; but unlike Watton-at-Stone, Stapleford was not later reopened. It remains as the only closed station on the entire line.

Routes

Notes

References

External links
Site of Stapleford on a navigable 1946 O.S. map

Disused railway stations in Hertfordshire
Former London and North Eastern Railway stations
Railway stations in Great Britain opened in 1924
Railway stations in Great Britain closed in 1939